The 2009 ISSF World Cup is the twenty-fourth annual edition of the ISSF World Cup in the Olympic shooting events, governed by the International Shooting Sport Federation. Four qualification competitions are held in each event, spanning from April to June, and the best shooters will qualify for the ISSF World Cup Final, which will take place in China in October. The shotgun finals were originally scheduled for Istanbul, but were later moved to the Beijing Shooting Range Clay Target Field, while the rifle and pistol events will be held at a range in Wuxi. Apart from those who qualify through the 2009 World Cup competitions, the defending champions and the reigning Olympic champions will also be invited to the final. The host country may also participate with at least two shooters regardless of qualification.

For the first time, the traditional World Cup competition at the Olympic shooting ranges in Munich included shotgun events contested at the new facilities built for the 2010 ISSF World Shooting Championships.

In 2008, it was decided not to give out any quota places for the shooting competitions at the 2012 Summer Olympics in London during the 2009 season.

Schedule

Medals by event

Men's rifle events

Men's pistol events

Men's shotgun events

Women's rifle events

Women's pistol events

Women's shotgun events

Multiple winners

Four titles 
  in women's 50 metre rifle three positions and 10 metre air rifle

Three titles 
  in men's 50 metre rifle prone

Two titles 
  in men's 50 metre rifle three positions
  in men's 50 metre pistol and 10 metre air pistol
  in women's 50 metre rifle three positions and 10 metre air rifle
  in men's trap
  in men's 50 metre pistol and 10 metre air pistol
  in men's 10 metre air rifle

See also 
 Shooting at the 2012 Summer Olympics – Qualification
 2009 World Shotgun Championships

References

External links 
 ISSF calendar
 Full results at issf-sports.org
 Live results for rifle and pistol at Sius
 Official San Marino ISSF World Cup 2009

ISSF World Cup
World Cup